Tatiana Alexandrovna Kokoreva (born 1 August 1988) is a Russian former pair skater. With former partner Egor Golovkin, she is the 2005 World Junior bronze medalist.

Programs 
(with Golovkin)

Competitive highlights 
(with Golovkin)

References

External links
 

Russian female pair skaters
Living people
1988 births
Sportspeople from Lipetsk
World Junior Figure Skating Championships medalists